The Santosham Best Debut Actress Award is given by the Santosham Film magazine as part of its annual Santosham Film Awards for Telugu films.

The award was first given to Kamalinee Mukherjee in 2003. Here is a list of the award winners and the films for which they won. Karthika Nair won for her work in Josh (2009).

References

Santosham Film Awards
Film awards for debut actress